Pandoraea pulmonicola is a Gram-negative, non-spore-forming, motile bacterium with a single polar flagellum, of the genus Pandoraea. P. pulmonicola has been isolated from respiratory samples of patients with cystic fibrosis and other respiratory diseases. P. pulmonicola is a part of the Burkholderia cepacia complex, which is a group of bacteria commonly associated with infections in individuals with compromised immune systems.

References

External links 
Type strain of Pandoraea pulmonicola at BacDive -  the Bacterial Diversity Metadatabase

Burkholderiaceae